Fissipunctia ypsillon, the dingy shears, is a species of moth of the family Noctuidae. It is found in the Palearctic realm (Europe, Morocco, Algeria, Turkey, Russia, Caucasus, Transcaucasia, Iraq, Iran, Afghanistan, Siberia, and the Russian Far East).

Description

The wingspan is 32–42 mm. The length of the forewings is 15–19 mm. Forewing grey, dusted with blackish, and with more or less reddish brown suffusion; a dark streak from base below cell; inner and outer lines pale, very obscure; submarginal line pale, distinct, generally preceded by dark marks; stigmata of the ground colour, the cell dark fuscous; claviform long, pointed, often followed by two black streaks to outer line; orbicular irregular in shape, often elongate below and touching reniform; hindwing fuscous, often paler towards base; the rarer grey form, with very sparse rufous suffusion represents the type; the commoner rufous-suffused examples are corticea Esp. ; ab. nigrescens Tutt is a rare form with blackish forewings; variegata Tutt is purplish blackish; the costa marked with a series of short black streaks; orbicular and upper part of reniform pale, likewise the claviform; veins pale, the intervals of the dark ground colour, giving a striated appearance; all the lines pale; — ab. conjuncta ab. nov. [Warren] is; purplish fuscous, the veins and stigmatal annuli whitish, the upper stigmata strongly conjoined: — in orenburghensis Bartel the ground colour is whitish grey, the darker shades rufous grey, especially the cell; the orbicular stigma large, whitish grey, prolonged below to touch the reniform, which is dark with a pale ring; the space beyond it rufous grey with the veins pale across it; below the median vein the claviform stigma and the area within the median shade are also pale grey;hindwing with basal half paler, showing a dark cellspot and outer line.
The larva is brown, sometimes inclining to reddish marked with black above, and the under surface is paler; there are three pale lines along the back, and one low down along each side.The head is pale brown freckled with darker brown.

Biology
The moth flies from June to August depending on the location.

The larvae feed on willow and poplar.

References

External links

Dingy Shears at UKmoths
Funet Taxonomy
Apterogenum ypsillon on Fauna Europaea
Apterogenum ypsillon on Lepiforum.de
Apterogenum ypsillon on Vlindernet.nl 

Xyleninae
Moths of Europe
Taxa named by Michael Denis
Taxa named by Ignaz Schiffermüller